Joseph Thomas Kerrigan (born January 30, 1954) is an American former Major League Baseball (MLB) relief pitcher, manager, and longtime pitching coach. He played for the Montreal Expos and Baltimore Orioles from 1976 to 1980, and managed the Boston Red Sox in 2001.

Biography
A native of Philadelphia, Pennsylvania, Kerrigan attended Father Judge High School and Temple University where he played in the 1972 College World Series. Later that summer, he played collegiate summer baseball in the Cape Cod Baseball League for the Orleans Cardinals. He was selected in the first round of the 1974 amateur draft by the Montreal Expos. His major league debut was on July 9, 1976. He was acquired along with Don Stanhouse and Gary Roenicke by the Baltimore Orioles from the Expos for Rudy May, Randy Miller and Bryn Smith at the Winter Meetings on December 7, 1977. He played with the Orioles until 1980.

Coaching career
His coaching career began in 1983 when he was named the bullpen coach for the Expos. From 1987 to 1991, he was the pitching coach for three different Montreal farm teams, and in 1992, became the pitching coach of the Expos. From 1997 to 2001 he filled the same role for the Red Sox under manager Jimy Williams, working with 1999 and 2000 Cy Young Award winner Pedro Martínez. In August 2001, after Williams was fired, Kerrigan was named the manager and signed a multi-year contract for the position with then-GM Dan Duquette. However, he led the team to a 17–26 record and, with new ownership taking over in the offseason, was replaced by Grady Little during spring training in 2002.

Kerrigan later served as pitching coach for the Philadelphia Phillies and was hired as the bullpen coach for the New York Yankees in November 2005. In October 2008, he became the pitching coach for the Pittsburgh Pirates. Kerrigan was relieved of his duty as pitching coach for the Pittsburgh Pirates on August 8, 2010.

Managerial record

References

 Associated Press, "Red Sox Replace Williams with Kerrigan", August 17, 2001
 Baseball Biography: Joe Kerrigan

External links
, or Retrosheet

  
  
  

1954 births
Living people
American expatriate baseball players in Canada
American expatriate baseball players in Venezuela
Baltimore Orioles players
Baseball coaches from Pennsylvania
Baseball players from Philadelphia
Boston Red Sox coaches
Boston Red Sox managers
Denver Bears players
Indianapolis Indians players
Major League Baseball bullpen coaches
Major League Baseball pitchers
Major League Baseball pitching coaches
Montreal Expos coaches
Montreal Expos players
New York Yankees coaches
Oklahoma City 89ers players
Orleans Firebirds players
Philadelphia Phillies coaches
Pittsburgh Pirates coaches
Québec Carnavals players
Quebec Metros players
Rochester Red Wings players
Temple Owls baseball players
Tigres de Aragua players
West Palm Beach Expos players